Shvartsman is a surname. Notable people with the surname include:

Alex Shvartsman (born 1975), American Magic: The Gathering player
Leonid Shvartsman (1920–2022), Soviet and Russian animator and artist
Roman Shvartsman (born 1936), Ukrainian public figure

See also
Schwarzmann